Alexander Schmieden (born 5 July 1993) is a German footballer who plays as a midfielder for FSV Jägersburg.

Career
Schmieden made his professional debut for SV Elversberg in the 3. Liga on 20 December 2013, coming on as a substitute in the 80th minute for Dominik Rohracker in the 0–3 home loss against Darmstadt 98.

References

External links
 Profile at DFB.de
 

1993 births
People from Sankt Ingbert
Footballers from Saarland
Living people
German footballers
Association football midfielders
SV Elversberg players
FK Pirmasens players
SV Saar 05 Saarbrücken players
SV Röchling Völklingen players
Regionalliga players
Oberliga (football) players
3. Liga players